160 Ann Street, Brisbane is an office tower located in the heart of  central business district (CBD) of Brisbane, Queensland in Australia and adjacent to  the Brisbane River. After its completion in 1972,  the tower was owned successively by Australian companies Zurich Australia Insurance, Precision Group,  Investa Property Group, and CorVal Partners.

History 
Since its construction in 1972, 160 Ann Street, Brisbane has had various owners.

In November 1995, Zurich Australia, part of the Zurich Insurance Group, bought it for $41.75 million. In 2005 it sold the building to Precision Group who, in 2006, transferred it to the Investa Property Group as part of a property swap. Its present owners, CorVal Partners, acquired the building in 2012.

In 2009 a study of the building was carried out as part of a Solar Hearting & Cooling Programme of the International Energy Agency. It was funded by the Australian Research Council and  "considered as a 'Critical Case' representing common physical and operational characteristics of typical high rise office buildings in Australia".

In 2011 Central Queensland University commenced its Brisbane campus in the building.

References

External links 

   CorVal Partners (owner)

Office buildings in Brisbane
Skyscrapers in Brisbane
Ann Street, Brisbane
Office buildings completed in 1972
Skyscraper office buildings in Australia